Bokermannohyla sapiranga is a species of frog in the family Hylidae. It is endemic to south-central Brazil (Federal District; eastern Goiás and adjacent Minas Gerais states). It type locality is Roncador Ecological Reserve.

References

Frogs of South America
sapiranga
Amphibians of Brazil
Endemic fauna of Brazil
Amphibians described in 2012
Taxa named by Adrian A. Garda
Taxa named by Adriano O. Maciel